Leigh French (born July 14, 1945) is an American actress.

Early life
French was born in Ashland, Kentucky.

Career 
In her early career as a regular on The Smothers Brothers Comedy Hour of the late-1960s, French portrayed a hippie named Goldie O'Keefe. The character was originally introduced, in an ostensible studio-audience interview segment, as Goldie Keif; both "Goldie" and "Keif" were slang terms for marijuana at the time. Reportedly, the slight name change to O'Keefe when she became a semi-regular was at the television network's insistence. Her segment of the show was called "Share a Little Tea with Goldie." At the time, "sharing tea" was a popular euphemism for getting high on marijuana. Following suit, her segment consisted largely of "helpful" household advice loaded with sex and drug-related double entendres.

French played a similar character, a San Francisco hippie type named Cobalt-Blue, in a 1968 episode ("Tag, You're It") of the I Spy series. She and Rob Reiner (both of whom had been members of The Committee improv group in San Francisco) also played hippies in the 1969 "Flower Power" episode of Gomer Pyle, U.S.M.C. French can also be seen in such films as WUSA (1970), The Drowning Pool (1975), Aloha, Bobby and Rose (1975), The Hollywood Knights (1980), and The Long Days of Summer (1980). Leigh also appeared as Goober Pyle's (George Lindsey) sister on a pilot episode for a sitcom called Goober & the Truckers' Paradise. The show, in which Goober and his sister managed a highway truck stop, was not picked up by networks.

French's acting work continued steadily through 2010, primarily performing behind the scenes and voiceover roles in animated features up to 2014.

Filmography

Film

Television

References

External links

1945 births
American film actresses
American television actresses
Actresses from Kentucky
Living people
21st-century American women